Vorniceni is a village in Strășeni District, Moldova. Population 4327.

Notable people
 Valentina Butnaru
 Capatina Vladislav

References

Villages of Strășeni District
Kishinyovsky Uyezd
Lăpușna County (Romania)
Ținutul Nistru